Trevor Blake (13 March 1937 – 23 August 2004) was a New Zealand cricketer and field hockey player from Whangarei. He represented his country at the 1964 Summer Olympics and competed in the field hockey competition, where New Zealand came 13th.

Blake was born in Whangarei in 1937.

Blake was a right-handed batsman who played for Northern Districts. Blake made a single first-class appearance for the team, during the 1964–65 season, against Canterbury.  From the middle order, he scored a duck in the first innings in which he batted, and a single run in the second.

Blake died in Whangarei on 23 August 2004.

References

External links
 

1937 births
2004 deaths
New Zealand cricketers
Northern Districts cricketers
Field hockey players at the 1964 Summer Olympics
Olympic field hockey players of New Zealand
New Zealand male field hockey players
Field hockey players from Whangārei
Cricketers from Whangārei